

Biography
Saadiya Kochar is an Indian woman photographer and solo traveller. Her works can be broadly classified into art and social documentary photography, although she dabbles into portraiture, street and fashion as well.

Early Years and Education
Saadiya was born into a Sikh family. Her birthplace is Jammu, Jammu and Kashmir. Kochar's education was from a missionary school, Convent of Jesus and Mary in Delhi but she never went to a regular college. Having studied mass communication, from Sri Aurobindo Institute of Mass communication she went on to study at Triveni Kala Sangam, under world renowned artist O. P. Sharma, a photographer famous for black and white images. She got a diploma in photography from ICPP, Australia.

Career

When she was 24, this Indian photographer published her first book, Being.....

Kochar, has worked in Kashmir for over a decade, has taught photography at the Pearl Academy of Fashion and is the creative head of astudio, in Delhi. In 2012, she organised a solo show, in New Delhi, of her images from Kashmir, titled Loss. Saadiya has shown her photographs through a few solo shows, earlier as well,  titled- Being...( thoughts, emotions and self-discovery displayed through the body), Zikr-the remembrance (Sufi practices)  has been a part of a number of group shows, in India as well as abroad. {https://saadiyakochar.com/} Being.Daring in black and white A book on the human form was released in 2004. Kochar has worked on a short video art project called Loss, about the troubles faced by Kashmiri Muslims and the Kashmiri Pandits. She continues to travel and work in Kashmir.

In 2013, she began a blog about her personal journey as a single, female photographer, navigating through the city, archiving her experiences of loss and longing, through photographs and writings . In 2017, she travelled through India by herself, covering the Northern, Eastern, Southern and Western Corridors. The project Road Tripping-Photowalli Gaadee is a pan India project that made its debut at the India Art Fair in a group show and at Cafe De Art in a solo one.

References

External links
Official website. 
Sneha Bhurra, 'The shape of dissent.' The Week, Feb 22, 2020
Swati Kumari, "Strip trip", Mid-day.com, 24 February 2009.
Shalini Singh, "Conflict camera", Hindustan Times, 29 May 2010.
 Road Tripping- Photowalli Gaadee- 
 A 100 Pieces Of Me-
 Indian Express 

Living people
Indian women photographers
Indian photographers
21st-century women photographers
Photographers from Delhi
Artists from Jammu and Kashmir
Social documentary photographers
1979 births
21st-century Indian photographers
Photographers from Jammu and Kashmir
Women photojournalists